Wiki Wiki can mean:
 The Wiki Wiki Shuttle - a shuttle in the Honolulu International Airport in Hawaii
 The phrase Wiki in Hawaiian
 WikiWiki - as a concept in Hawaii and other places